Jeffrey Robert Lurie (born September 8, 1951) is an American motion picture producer, businessman, and the owner of the Philadelphia Eagles of the National Football League (NFL).

Early life and education
Lurie was born to a Jewish family in Boston, the son of Nancy (née Smith) and Morris John Lurie. His grandfather, Philip Smith, founded the General Cinema movie theater chain, which was one of the largest operators of drive-in movie theaters in the United States. His uncle is Richard A. Smith. He has two siblings, Peter and Cathy. His father died April 14, 1961, at the age of 44 when Jeffrey was nine years old.

In the late 1960s, General Cinema began acquiring bottling franchises, including a Pepsi bottling operation. General Cinema evolved over the years into Harcourt General Inc., a $3.7-billion conglomerate based in Chestnut Hill, Massachusetts, with 23,700 employees worldwide. In its heyday it was the nation's fourth-largest chain of movie theaters, owned several publishing houses, three insurance companies, and a leading global consulting firm. In 1984 minority interest in Carter Hawley Hale was acquired, which was at the time the tenth-largest clothing retailer in the United States, including Bergdorf Goodman and Neiman-Marcus.

Lurie earned a B.A. from Clark University, a master's degree in psychology from Boston University, and a doctorate in social policy from The Heller School for Social Policy and Management at Brandeis University, where he wrote his thesis on the depiction of women in Hollywood movies. He was born to Jewish parents but has spent his adult life as a non-practicing Jew. Prior to entering business, Lurie served as an adjunct assistant professor of social policy at Boston University.

Career

In 1983, he left academia to join General Cinema Corporation, a major film company founded by his grandfather, Philip Smith, and headed by his uncle, Richard A. Smith. He worked as an executive in the company as a liaison between General Cinema Corporation and the production community in Hollywood. He was also an advisor in The General Cinema national film buying office.

He then founded Chestnut Hill Productions in 1985, which produced a string of Hollywood movies and TV shows. The company initially started off with a multi-feature joint venture with Tri-Star Pictures to develop projects, then in 1987, three of the Chestnut Hill projects were picked up by MGM/UA Communications Co., two with Paramount Pictures and Warner Bros. Pictures each, and a single picture Chestnut Hill is producing for Universal Pictures, and a majority of the eight Chestnut Hill productions would be received by Tri-Star Pictures which then become an independent production company. Tri-Star Pictures received first look at all projects that were handled by Chestnut Hill Productions, with Tri-Star and Chestnut Hill to co-finance development and Tri-Star could pick up the entire tab on production.

On February 27, 2011, the Lurie-produced movie Inside Job won an Academy Award (Oscar) for best documentary film. The company also produced television commercials.  Two years later he won a second Oscar when Inocente, in which he was executive producer, won for Best Documentary Short Film.

In 2020, Forbes ranked him No. 319 on the Forbes 400 list of the richest people in America.

Philadelphia Eagles ownership

As a fan of all the Boston sports teams, Lurie went to games and put himself to sleep listening to the Boston Red Sox on his transistor radio. The Luries had been season-ticket holders since the New England Patriots franchise began in 1960, the year the American Football League was founded. Lurie cheered for Gino Cappelletti, Houston Antwine, and Babe Parilli. In 1993, Lurie tried to buy the New England Patriots, but he dropped out of the bidding at $150 million when his uncle Richard Smith nixed the purchase based on the financials.

Lurie's name also had surfaced in sale talks regarding the Los Angeles Rams, and he was a potential investor in a bid for a Baltimore expansion team with Robert Tisch, who subsequently bought 50% of the New York Giants. Five months later, Smith agreed to let his nephew buy the Philadelphia Eagles. Lurie contacted Norman Braman, then owner of the Eagles. Lurie bought the Philadelphia Eagles on May 6, 1994, from Braman for $195 million (equivalent to $ million in ). Lurie and his mother, Nancy Lurie Marks (the only daughter of Philip Smith), borrowed $190 million from the Bank of Boston to buy the Eagles. To back the Bank of Boston loan, Lurie put up millions of dollars worth of personal stock in Harcourt General and GC Companies Inc. as equity capital. Additionally, he and his mother pledged their stock in the family trust as collateral so Lurie could borrow the rest.
In 2017, Forbes valued the club at $2.65 billion, ranking them 10th among NFL teams in value.

On February 4, 2018, the Eagles defeated the Patriots to win Super Bowl LII by the score of 41–33, giving Lurie his first title as Eagles owner. The victory evened the score with New England, as the previous Lurie-era Super Bowl appearance was a 24–21 loss to the Patriots in Super Bowl XXXIX.

Personal life
In a pre-production meeting for I Love You To Death, Lurie met Christina Weiss, a former actress who was working for his production company. In 1992, Lurie married Weiss in Gstaad, Switzerland. They had two children: a son Julian (b. 1995) and a daughter Milena (b.1993). In 2012, the couple announced that they were divorcing; the divorce was finalized in August 2012. She received a "sizeable" ownership interest in the Philadelphia Eagles as part of the divorce settlement. On May 4, 2013, he married Tina Lai.

Filmography
He was a producer in all films unless otherwise noted.

Film

As an actor

Thanks

Television

As an actor

Awards and honors
Three-time Academy Award winner:
2011 for Best Documentary as executive producer of Inside Job
2013 for Best Documentary Short Film as executive producer of Inocente
2022 for Best Documentary Feature as executive producer of Summer of Soul.
Super Bowl LII champion as owner of the Eagles

References

External links
 Philadelphia Eagles profile
 

1951 births
Living people
American billionaires
American chief executives of professional sports organizations
Philadelphia Eagles owners
Boston University faculty
Boston University College of Arts and Sciences alumni
Heller School for Social Policy and Management alumni
Clark University alumni
Jewish American sportspeople
American company founders
Businesspeople from Boston
Buckingham Browne & Nichols School alumni
Smith family (theaters)